The Philippine Olympic Committee Inc. (POC)  is the National Olympic Committee of the Philippines.

The POC is a private, non-governmental organization composed of and serve as the mother organization of all National Sports Associations (NSAs) in the Philippines. It is recognized by the International Olympic Committee (IOC) as having the sole authority for representation of the Philippines in the Olympic Games, the Asian Games, the Southeast Asian Games and other multi-event competitions.

The POC is financially independent and does not receive any subsidy from government, though its member NSAs receive some financial assistance from the Philippine Sports Commission. Instead, the POC supports its own activities with funds generated from sponsorships, licensing fees on the use of the Olympic marks, IOC subsidy and proceeds from special projects and donations.

History

Organized sports was first introduced in the Philippines during the American administration of the islands with the establishment of the Philippine Amateur Athletic Federation (PAAF) in January 1911. The PAAF organized the inaugural Far Eastern Championship Games in 1913 which was contested by China, Japan, and the host country, Philippines.

The first Filipino Olympian was David Nepomuceno, who participated in Athletics in the 100m and 200m sprints events at the 1924 Summer Olympics in Paris. However, it was only in 1929 when the International Olympic Committee recognized the PAAF as the Philippines' National Olympic Committee. The recognition was a year after swimmer Teofilo Yldefonso won the Philippines' first Olympic medal—a bronze in the 200 meters breaststroke event at the 1928 Summer Olympics in Amsterdam. In 1975 the PAAF was renamed to Philippine Olympic Committee (POC) after the establishment of the Department of Youth and Sports Development which effectively abolished the former.

The Philippine Olympic Committee has held office along with the Philippine Sports Commission at the Rizal Memorial Sports Complex until the construction of the PhilSports Complex which became the headquarters of the two organizations.

In January 2023, amendments on leadership and composition of member national sports associations of the POC took effect.

Governance

Executive board
The Philippine Olympic Committee is governed by its executive board, which composes the chairman, president, first and second vice president, secretary general, treasurer, auditor and the immediate past president. The executive board is also joined by four members elected by the board members and any IOC members present in the country. The executive board holds at least one meeting every month and makes valid acts if majority of its members are present which is seven or more person in all cases. Decisions by the POC are voted  upon by the members of the executive board and in case of a tie, the chairman decides upon the matter concerned.

Commissions or committees are also organized by the POC. The Membership, Arbitration, Ethics, Technical, Ways and Means and Athlete’s Commissions are the standing commissions of the POC. The creation of additional commissions are subject to approval by the executive board upon recommendation by the President.

President 

Ambrosio Padilla was the first president of the Philippine Olympic Committee (POC) serving from 1975 to 1976. Previously he served as president of the POC's predecessor, the Philippine Amateur Athletic Federation from 1970 to 1975.

The president has the power to call a special meeting of the executive board upon a written request addressed to the secretary general. This privilege can also be invoke by the majority of the executive board. The president also recommends the creation of a new commission within the POC, as well as the appointment of each of the commission's chairman and members, and its duties, tasks, and authorities, all subject to the approval of the board.

Committees under the Philippine Olympic Committee

Members
Sports associations that are members of the Philippine Olympic Committee are recognized as National Sports Associations (NSAs). There are two levels of memberships within the POC which is regular and associate. The POC also gives accreditation to recognize disciplines of sports.

Application process
Since February 2009, applicant National Sports Associations should have an official address and contact numbers (telephone, fax, email address) or official website and a directory of its officers and members, and a board resolution authorizing the signatory officer to apply for POC membership with an indication of the level of membership. Also it is required that a certificate of membership with the pertinent International Federation recognized by the International Olympic Committee which governs the sport of the applicant internationally to be submitted to the POC, unless the International Federation requires its members first to gain recognition from their National Olympic Committees. International Federation membership is required for regular membership. A notarized affidavit is also to be submitted which states that the applicant sports association is the only legitimate and governing body of their sport in the national level with the POC.

The prospect national sports association should also have organized at least two annual National Championships and present documenting evidences to the POC which includes duly certified applicants, results, photos, and relevant press releases. It is also required that articles be published in three major daily newspapers of general circulation which states that the applicant is seeking POC membership. A copy of the publication, as well as an affidavit of publication from the newspapers concerned to be presented to the POC. If there are many other sports bodies claiming to represent the same sport of the applicant in the Philippines, an objection to the application for membership of the applicant sports association must be presented before the POC Membership Commission within fifteen days from the date of publication.

The a POC Membership Commission gives recommendations to the POC following the complete submission of required documents for applications. The POC membership of applicant associations is subject to approval of the POC General Assembly upon the recommendation by the Membership Commission. If the regular or associate membership of the applicant is approved by the POC, the nature of the membership shall be provisional for one year pending a review of the association's performance in national and international levels.

The applicant's NSA President as a POC member should not be an incumbent member.

Suspension and expulsion
A member of the POC could be suspended or expelled from the national olympic committee by 3/4 vote of the POC General Assembly.

List

Regular members

Associate Members

Recognized members

Former members

Notes

See also
2016 and 2018 Philippine Olympic Committee elections
Philippine Sports Commission
Project Gintong Alay

References

External links
Philippine Olympic Committee website

National Olympic Committees
 A
 
1975 establishments in the Philippines
Sports organizations established in 1975